Dynamo Open Air is a festival in the Netherlands held (almost) every year between 1986 and 2005. It was reborn in 2008 as Dynamo Outdoor and in 2015 as Dynamo Metal Fest.

History
Originally held to celebrate the fifth anniversary of the Dynamo rock club in Eindhoven, it grew from 5,000 people in the Dynamo parking lot up to 118,000 attendees in 1995. Until this day, the 1995 edition still is the largest multi-day open air festival ever held in the Netherlands. This caused too much pressure on the Dutch infrastructure and the festival had to shrink to a maximum of 60,000 visitors for 1996. From there it went downhill, mostly because the festival could not find a permanent venue. In 1999 Dynamo Open Air was held on a former rubbish dump in Mierlo, and the following year it went to the Goffertpark in Nijmegen. That was the first time DOA was held outside the province of North Brabant, and it was the first time in years that the festival had to shrink down to only one day. The previous years it had always been a two- or three-day festival.

In 2001, the organisation thought they had found a site where the festival could return on a yearly basis, near the town of Lichtenvoorde. However, the threat of foot-and-mouth disease caused trouble, and Dynamo Open Air had to be cancelled. In 2002 it returned, at the site of the Bospop festival, but 2003 was another year without a Dynamo festival, because it would violate a recently passed law about animal protection during breeding season. For 2004, the festival returned to Nijmegen, at the same location where it took place in 2000. In 2005, the festival used the site of the Dauwpop festival, and the reunited Anthrax headlined the stage.

In an attempt to revitalise the festival, the current organization of the Dynamo youth center decided to change the festival's name from Dynamo Open Air to Dynamo Outdoor. In 2008, the first Dynamo Outdoor festival was held in the centre of Eindhoven, with bands such as Mad Sin, Anathema and Born From Pain performing. The festival was once again held in Eindhoven in the following year, with Destine, Stahlzeit, Asphyx, Textures, The Butcher and Municipal Waste on the bill.
 
The revival of the festival occurred with a new name as Dynamo Metal Fest, which has taken place every year since 2015. The festival had taken place traditionally on the second or third Saturday in July from 2015 to 2018; for the 2019 edition, it was converted into a two-day festival. After the 2020 edition was cancelled because of the COVID-19 pandemic, Dynamo Metal Fest was scheduled to return in August 2021, however again cancelled due to the COVID-19 pandemic. The Dynamo Metal Fest was again held in August 2022.

Live recordings

In 1995, Nailbomb had their performance recorded at the festival and it was released as Proud to Commit Commercial Suicide the same year it was recorded.  It was released by Roadrunner Records  In 2005, live footage of the performance was released on DVD and it was called Live at Dynamo.  It was also released by Roadrunner Records.  In May 1998, guest band Death recorded stock footage of their performance. Three years later, in an effort to raise money to pay for Chuck Schuldiner's cancer treatment, the footage was limitedly released in October 2001 by Nuclear Blast on CD and DVD formats under the name Live In Eindhoven, two months before Schuldiner's ultimate demise.

Line-ups and dates

Dynamo Open Air

1986

Cancelled shows : Lääz Rockit

1987

Cancelled shows : Agent Steel (replaced by Testament)

1988

1989

1990

1991

1992

1993

Cancelled shows: Therapy?, Tool (replaced by Z)

1994

1995

1996

Cancelled shows : Halford (replaced by Sacred Reich)

1997

1998

Cancelled shows : Fear Factory (replaced by Death), Human Waste Project (replaced by Ultraspank) and Limp Bizkit (announced the day of the appearance, but didn't play).

1999

Cancelled bands : Bolt Thrower, Morbid Angel, Speedealer and Skarhead. The three latter bands were replaced by Arch Enemy, Goatsnake and Merauder, respectively.

2000

Cancelled shows : Entombed (replaced by Destruction)

2001
Festival cancelled due to the threat of foot and mouth disease.

The announced bands were: After Forever, Amen, Backfire!, Behemoth, Brightside, Catastrophic, Cradle of Filth, Destiny's End, Destroÿer 666, Discipline, Disturbed, Dreadlock Pussy, Dropkick Murphys, Dying Fetus, Exhumed, Hed PE, Ignite, In Extremo, Krisiun, Length of Time, Liar, Lost Horizon, Macabre, Merauder, M.O.D., Motörhead, Mudvayne, Napalm Death, Nasum, Nevermore, Opeth, Pain of Salvation, Papa Roach, Savatage, Saxon, Severe Torture, Shelter, Slipknot, Soulfly, Spineshank, Static-X, Symphony X, Terra Firma, Tool, The Union Underground, Vader, Wicked Mystic, Within Temptation.

Tool scheduled a headlining show at 013 in Tilburg on the day they were supposed to play, while Slipknot and few other bands played a "mini-festival" at Maaspoort in Den Bosch on May 25. Soulfly played more club shows in the Netherlands.

2002

2003
Festival cancelled. No bands seem to have been announced.

2004

2005

Dynamo Metalfest

2015

2016

2017

2018

2019

2020
Festival cancelled due to the threat of coronavirus. Bands that were supposed to play were Exodus, Obituary, Midnight, Flotsam and Jetsam, Heaven Shall Burn, Sepultura, Jinjer and Beast in Black.

2021
Festival cancelled due to coronavirus. Bands that were supposed to play were Heaven Shall Burn, Testament, Bay Area Interthrashional, Sacred Reich, The Black Dahlia Murder, Firewind, Rings of Saturn, Amon Amarth, Candlemass, Clutch, Jinjer, Municipal Waste, Unleash the Archers and Dress the Dead.

2022

References

External links
Official website

Music festivals in the Netherlands
Heavy metal festivals in the Netherlands
Recurring events established in 1986
1986 establishments in the Netherlands
Festivals disestablished in 2005
2005 disestablishments in the Netherlands
Music in Limburg (Netherlands)
Music in North Brabant
Music in Overijssel
Music in Eindhoven
Music in Nijmegen
Geldrop-Mierlo
Hellendoorn
Weert